The International Plant Nutrition Colloquium (IPNC) is an international conference held every four years for the promotion of research within the field of plant nutrition. Prior to 1981, it was known as the International Colloquium on Plant Analysis and Fertiliser Problems. The IPNC is organised by the International Plant Nutrition Council, which "seeks to advance science-based non-commercial research and education in plant nutrition in order to highlight the importance of this scientific field for crop production, food security, human health and sustainable environmental protection". It is considered that the IPNC is the most important international meeting on plant nutrition globally, with more than 800 delegates attending each meeting. The IPNC covers research in the fields of plant mineral nutrition, plant molecular biology, plant genetics, agronomy, horticulture, ecology, environmental sciences, and fertilizer use and production.

In honour of Professor Horst Marschner, who was a passionate supporter of students and young researchers, the IPNC has established the Marschner Young Scientist Award for outstanding early-career researchers and PhD students with a potential to become future research leaders.

The current President of the International Plant Nutrition Council is Professor Ciro A. Rosolem from the São Paulo State University. The next IPNC is to be held in Iguazu Falls, Brazil, from 22-27 August 2022.

Past and future locations for the IPNC:

References

External links
IPNC 2017 Official Website
IPNC 2013 Official Website
IPNC 2009 Official Website

Biology conferences